National Capital Region Institute of Medical Sciences, Meerut or N.C.R. Institute of Medical Sciences, Meerut is a private medical college run by KSD Charitable Trust, situated at Hapur-Meerut road in Meerut district, Uttar Pradesh.
It was started in 2018 when Medical Council of India gives it permission to start M.B.B.S. course. It is affiliated with Ch. Charan Singh University, Meerut.

References

External links
Official website

Private medical colleges in India
Medical colleges in Uttar Pradesh
Meerut district
Educational institutions established in 2018
2018 establishments in Uttar Pradesh